Man with a Vision is the third studio album by John Parr, released in 1992. The majority of the album was produced by Parr, except "Man With a Vision", produced by John Wolff, and "Restless Heart", produced by Harold Faltermeyer. The album was released in the UK by Music for Nations, in Germany by Edelton, Switzerland by Blue Martin Records, and Austria and Scandinavia by Generation Records.

Two singles were released from the album, "Man with a Vision" and "It's Starting All Over Again". "Restless Heart" had been previously released for The Running Man soundtrack in 1987, and as a single in the UK and Germany in 1988. "Man with a Vision" was originally recorded by Seven in 1990, with Parr as producer.

Speaking to the Get Ready to Rock! webzine in 2011, Parr spoke of the litigation he suffered from in the 1990s:

Track listing

Chart performance

References

1992 albums
John Parr albums